La vida breve, The brief life, or A brief life may refer to:
La vida breve (opera)
La vida breve (novel)

See also 

 The Brief Wondrous Life of Oscar Wao
La vida precoz y breve de Sabina Rivas